Stéphane Lach (born 10 June 1933) is a French former professional racing cyclist. He rode in four editions of the Tour de France.

References

External links
 

1933 births
Living people
French male cyclists
People from Soissons
Cyclists from Hauts-de-France